The Lake Okeechobee Scenic Trail (LOST) is a 109-mile multi-use path around Lake Okeechobee, the seventh largest lake in the United States and the largest in the state of Florida. The trail began as the Okeechobee Segment of the Florida National Scenic Trail (FNST), a 1,000 mile trail that runs from Miami to Pensacola. The USDA and National Forest Service dedicated the Okeechobee Segment as part of the FNST in 1993. Most of the trail is atop the 35-feet tall Herbert Hoover Dike. The trail crosses five counties, Hendry, Glades, Okeechobee, Martin and Palm Beach. Many stretches run along state and county highways, including Florida State Road 78.

Facilities
There are 13 camping areas around the trail, most of which have no water or sanitation facilities.  While the trail circumnavigates the entire lake, there are portions in which the traveler must come down from the levee.  In these areas, they may encounter heavy traffic and/or alligators. Because most of the trail runs atop a levee, there is very little shelter from the Florida sun, and running off the edge may result in a dangerous, rapid descent.

Restrictions
Because the trail is administered by the federal government, firearms are prohibited. Groundfires are prohibited, pets must be kept on a leash, and all trash must be carried out.

Closures
Because of the age of the dike and the instability of the terrain, there are frequent partial closures of the trail. A thirty-mile section from Mayaca to Canal Point is currently closed for renovation of the levee. Additionally, the portion of the trail running from Taylor Creek to Nubbin Slough section, the portion from Pahokee to Torry Island section, South Bay to Clewiston and Liberty Point to Lakeport section of the Lake Okeechobee Scenic Trail as well as a portion of the Florida National Scenic Trail are closed for extensive dike rehabilitation work. The US Army Corps of Engineers maintains the trail and posts information about trail conditions on their website.

Access points

According to the Corps of Engineers, the following access points are available:

Nubbin Slough  
Belle Glade 
Fisheating Creek South 
Henry Creek 
South Bay 
Fisheating Creek North 
Chancy Bay 
John Stretch Park 
Bare Beach 
Port Mayaca North 
Clewiston East 
Harney Pond Canal 
Port Mayaca South  
Clewiston West	 
Indian Prairie Canal 
Canal Point 
Liberty Point 
Kissimmee River 
Pahokee 
Moore Haven East 
Okeechobee 
Rardin Park 
Moore Haven West

References

External links
 Corps of Engineers Map
 Army Corps' list of current closures
 Lake Okeechobee Scenic Trail at 100 Florida Trails

Hiking trails in Florida
Bike paths in Florida
1993 establishments in Florida
Lake Okeechobee